Tetrigidae is an ancient family in the order Orthoptera, which also includes similar families such as crickets, grasshoppers, and their allies. Species within the Tetrigidae are variously called groundhoppers, pygmy grasshoppers, pygmy devils or (mostly historical) "grouse locusts".

Diagnostic characteristics

Tetrigidae are typically less than 20 mm in length and are recognizable by a long pronotum. This pronotum extends over the length of the abdomen, sometimes to the tip of the wings, and ends in a point. In other Orthoptera, the pronotum is short and covers neither the abdomen nor the wings. Tetrigidae are generally cryptic in coloration. Some species have enlarged pronota that mimic leaves, stones or twigs. Other characteristics pygmy grasshoppers exhibit in comparison to other Orthoptera families are the lack of an arolium between the claws, the first thoracic sternite being modified into collar-like structure called sternomentum, a tarsal formula of 2-2-3, scaly fore wings, and developed hind wings.

General biology
In temperate regions, Tetrigidae are generally found along streams and ponds, where they feed on algae and diatoms. The North American species Paratettix aztecus and Paratettix mexicanus, for example, depend on aquatic primary production for between 80% and 100% of their diet. Riparian species are capable of swimming on the surface of the water, and readily leap into the water when alarmed Some species in the tribe Scelimenini are fully aquatic and capable of swimming underwater.

The highest biodiversity of Tetrigidae is found in tropical forests. Some tropical species are arboreal and live among mosses and lichens in tree buttresses or in the canopy, while others live on the forest floor.

Like other Orthoptera, Tetrigidae have a hemimetabolous development, in which eggs hatch into nymphs. Unlike other temperate Orthoptera, however, temperate Tetrigidae generally overwinter as adults.

Some subfamilies within the Tetrigidae, such as the Batrachideinae, are sometimes elevated to family rank besides the Tetrigidae.

Arulenus miae is a pygmy grasshopper species from the tropical mountainous rainforests of the Philippines. The species was firstly discovered in Facebook post.

Etymology
Origin of the name of the family is not completely clear as there are different sources on its etymology. The name may be derived from Latin tetricus or taetricus, meaning harsh, sour, severe. The name may also originate from the earlier name 'Tettigidae', based on Tettix (synonym of Tetrix), which was preoccupied by Tettigidae (synonym of Cicadidae). Because of the preoccupation by the cicadas' family name, the second 't' in 'tt' was changed into 'r', resulting in the word Tetrigidae.

Subfamilies and Genera
Approximately 2,000 species have been described; according to the Orthoptera Species File the following genera are included:

Subfamily Batrachideinae 

Auth.: Bolívar, 1887; selected genera:
 Batrachidea Serville, 1838
 Saussurella Bolívar, 1887
 Tettigidea Scudder, 1862

Subfamily Cladonotinae 

Auth.: Bolívar, 1887; selected genera:

Tribe Cladonotini Bolívar, 1887
 Cladonotus Saussure, 1862
 Deltonotus Hancock, 1904
 Piezotettix Bolívar, 1887

Tribe Choriphyllini Cadena-Castañeda & Silva, 2019
 Choriphyllum Serville, 1838
 Phyllotettix Hancock, 1902

Tribe Valalyllini Deranja, Kasalo, Adžić, Franjević & Skejo, 2022
 Lepocranus Devriese, 1991
 Valalyllum Deranja, Kasalo, Adžić, Franjević & Skejo, 2022

Tribe Xerophyllini Günther, 1979
SE Asia - selected genera:
 Potua Bolívar, 1887 (genus group)
 Xerophyllum Fairmaire, 1846

Tribe Unassigned
 Austrohancockia Günther, 1938
 Cota Bolívar, 1887
 Epitettix Hancock, 1907
 Nesotettix Holdhaus, 1909

Subfamily Lophotettiginae 
Auth.: Hancock, 1909
 Lophotettix Hancock, 1909
 Phelene Bolívar, 1906

Subfamily Metrodorinae 
Auth.: Bolívar, 1887; selected genera:

Tribe Amorphopini Günther, 1939
 Amorphopus Serville, 1838

Tribe Cleostratini Hancock, 1907

 Cleostratus (insect) Stål, 1877 (Philippines)

Tribe Clinophaestini Storozhenko, 2013
 Birmana Brunner von Wattenwyl, 1893
 Clinophaestus Storozhenko, 2013

Tribe Miriatrini Cadena-Castañeda & Cardona, 2015 (monotypic)
 Miriatra Bolívar, 1906

Tribe Ophiotettigini Tumbrinck & Skejo, 2017
 Ophiotettix Walker, 1871
 Uvarovithyrsus Storozhenko, 2016

Tribe Unassigned
 Bolivaritettix Günther, 1939
 Cleostratoides Storozhenko, 2013
 Crimisus Bolívar, 1887
 Hildegardia (insect) Günther, 1974
 Holocerus Bolívar, 1887
 Macromotettix Günther, 1939
 Mazarredia Bolívar, 1887
 Pseudoparatettix Günther, 1937
 Pseudoxistrella Liang, 1991
 Vaotettix Podgornaya, 1986

Subfamily Scelimeninae 

Auth.: Hancock, 1907
Tribe Scelimenini Hancock, 1907; selected genera:
 Amphibotettix Hancock, 1906
 Austrohancockia Günther, 1938
 Bidentatettix Zheng, 1992
 Discotettix Costa, 1864
 Gavialidium Saussure, 1862
 Scelimena Serville, 1838
incertae sedis
 Zhengitettix Liang, 1994

Subfamily Tetriginae  

Auth.: Serville, 1838

Tribe Dinotettigini Günther, 1979
 Afrocriotettix Günther, 1938
 Dinotettix Bolívar, 1905
 Ibeotettix Rehn, 1930
 Lamellitettix Hancock, 1904
 Marshallacris Rehn, 1948
 Pseudamphinotus Günther, 1979

Tribe Tetrigini Serville, 1838
 Clinotettix Bei-Bienko, 1933
 Coptotettix Bolívar, 1887
 Euparatettix Hancock, 1904
 Exothotettix Zheng & Jiang, 1993
 Hydrotetrix Uvarov, 1926
 Paratettix Bolívar, 1887
 Tetrix Latreille, 1802 (synonym Depressotetrix Karaman, 1960)
 Thibron Rehn, 1939

Tribe unassigned:
 Aalatettix Zheng & Mao, 2002
 Alulatettix Liang, 1993
 Ankistropleuron Bruner, 1910
 Bannatettix Zheng, 1993
 Bienkotetrix Karaman, 1965
 Bufonides Bolívar, 1898
 Carolinotettix Willemse, 1951
 Coptottigia Bolívar, 1912
 Cranotettix Grant, 1955
 Ergatettix Kirby, 1914
 Flatocerus Liang & Zheng, 1984
 Formosatettix Tinkham, 1937
 Formosatettixoides Zheng, 1994
 Gibbotettix Zheng, 1992
 Hedotettix Bolívar, 1887
 Leptacrydium Chopard, 1945
 Macquillania Günther, 1972
 Micronotus Hancock, 1902
 Neocoptotettix Shishodia, 1984
 Neotettix Hancock, 1898
 Nomotettix Morse, 1894
 Ochetotettix Morse, 1900
 Oxyphyllum Hancock, 1909
 Phaesticus Uvarov, 1940
 Sciotettix Ichikawa, 2001
 Stenodorus Hancock, 1906
 Teredorus Hancock, 1907
 Tettiella Hancock, 1909
 Tettiellona Günther, 1979
 Uvarovitettix Bazyluk & Kis, 1960
 Xiaitettix Zheng & Liang, 1993

Subfamily Tripetalocerinae 
Auth.: Bolívar, 1887
Tripetalocerinae was originally described by Bolívar in 1887 to gather all the Tetrigidae genera of the old world with widened antennae (e.g. Arulenus, Discotettix, Hirrius, Ophiotettix, Tripetalocera). This subfamily today includes only two species in two genera - Tripetalocera (with one species) from India and Borneo and Tripetaloceroides (with one species) from Vietnam and PR China. Members of the subfamily are characteristic within Tetrigidae by massive antennae built up of only eight segments (other Tetrigidae have usually 11-16, Batrachideinae 18-22). Till recently, the subfamily included two tribes - Tripetalocerini and Clinophaestini (including Clinophaestus and Birmana), but the later was moved to the subfamily Metrodorinae due to similarity to Ophiotettigini.

 Tripetalocera - monotypic Tripetalocera ferruginea Westwood, 1834
 Tripetaloceroides Storozhenko, 2013 - monotypic Tripetaloceroides tonkinensis (Günther, 1938)

Subfamily unassigned

Criotettigini
Auth. Kevan, 1966
 Criotettix Bolívar, 1887
 Dasyleurotettix Rehn, 1904

Thoradontini
Auth. Kevan, 1966
 Eucriotettix Hebard, 1930
 Loxilobus Hancock, 1904
 Thoradonta Hancock, 1909

Subfamily and tribe unassigned

 Bolotettix Hancock, 1907
 Cyphotettix Rehn, 1952
 †Eozaentetrix Zessin, 2017
 Euloxilobus Sjöstedt, 1936
 Paramphinotus Zheng, 2004
 Peronotettix Rehn, 1952
 Phaesticus Uvarov, 1940 (synonym Flatocerus Liang & Zheng, 1984)
 Probolotettix Günther, 1939
 Pseudosystolederus Günther, 1939
 Syzygotettix Günther, 1938
 Tettitelum Hancock, 1915
 †Archaeotetrix Sharov, 1968
 †Prototetrix Sharov, 1968

References

External links

Pygmy locusts
Pygmy grasshoppers
BugGuide.net

 
Orthoptera families
Extant Triassic first appearances